Simple Minds are a Scottish rock band formed in Glasgow in 1977. They have released a string of hit singles, becoming best known internationally for "Don't You (Forget About Me)" (1985), which topped the Billboard Hot 100 in the United States. Other commercially successful singles include "Glittering Prize" (1982), "Someone Somewhere in Summertime" (1982), "Waterfront" (1983) and "Alive and Kicking" (1985), as well as the UK number one single "Belfast Child" (1989).

Simple Minds have achieved five UK Albums chart number one albums, Sparkle in the Rain (1984), Once Upon a Time (1985), Live in the City of Light (1987), Street Fighting Years (1989), and Glittering Prize 81/92 (1992). They have sold more than 60 million albums worldwide. They were the most commercially successful Scottish band of the 1980s. Simple Minds have also achieved considerable chart success in the United States, Australia, Germany, Spain, Italy and New Zealand. Despite various personnel changes, they continue to record and tour.

In 2014, Simple Minds were awarded the Q Inspiration Award for their contribution to the music industry and an Ivor Novello Award in 2016 for Outstanding Song Collection from the British Academy of Songwriters, Composers, and Authors. Other notable recognitions include nominations for both the MTV Video Music Award for Best Direction and MTV Video Music Award for Best Art Direction for "Don't You (Forget About Me)" in 1985, nomination for the Brit Award for British Group in 1986 and for the American Music Award for Favorite Pop/Rock Band/Duo/Group in 1987. "Belfast Child" was nominated for the Song of the Year at the 1990 Brit Awards.

The nucleus of Simple Minds consists of the two remaining original members, Jim Kerr (vocals) and Charlie Burchill (electric & acoustic guitars, occasional keyboards after 1990, saxophone and violin). The other current band members are Ged Grimes (bass guitar),  Cherisse Osei (drums), Sarah Brown (backing vocals), Gordy Goudie (additional guitar & keyboards) and Berenice Scott (keyboards). Notable former members include Mick MacNeil (keyboards), Derek Forbes (bass), Brian McGee & Mel Gaynor (drums).

History

Roots/Johnny & The Self-Abusers (1977)
The roots of Simple Minds are in the short-lived punk band Johnny & The Self-Abusers, founded on the South Side of Glasgow in early 1977. The band was conceived (initially as an imaginary band) by would-be Glasgow scene-maker Alan Cairnduff, although he left the job of organising the band to his friend John Milarky. At Cairnduff's suggestion, Milarky teamed up with two musicians he had never worked with before – budding singer and lyricist Jim Kerr and guitarist Charlie Burchill. Kerr and Burchill had known each other since the age of eight. After joining Johnny & The Self-Abusers, they brought in two of their school friends, Brian McGee on drums and Tony Donald on bass (all four had previously played together in the schoolboy band Biba-Rom!).

With Milarky established as singer, guitarist and saxophonist, the line-up was completed by his friend Allan McNeill as third guitarist. Kerr and Burchill also doubled on keyboards and violin respectively. In common with the early punk bands, various members took on stage names—Milarky became "Johnnie Plague", Kerr became "Pripton Weird", McNeill chose "Sid Syphilis" and Burchill chose "Charlie Argue".

Johnny & The Self-Abusers played their first gig on Easter Monday, 11 April 1977, at the Doune Castle pub in Glasgow. The band played support to rising punk stars Generation X in Edinburgh two weeks later. The band went on to play a summer of concerts in Glasgow, but soon split into two factions, with Milarky and McNeill on one side and Kerr, Donald, Burchill and McGee on the other: at the same time, Milarky's compositions were being edged out in favour of those of Kerr and Burchill.

In November 1977, Johnny & The Self-Abusers released its only single, "Saints and Sinners", on Chiswick Records (which was dismissed as being "rank and file" in a Melody Maker review). The band split on the same day that the single was released, with Milarky and McNeill going on to form The Cuban Heels. Ditching the stage names and the overt punkiness, the remaining members continued together as Simple Minds (naming themselves after a David Bowie lyric from his song "Jean Genie", making their very first performance at Glasgow's Satellite City on 17 January 1978.

Original line-up settles (1978)

In January 1978, Simple Minds recruited Duncan Barnwell as a second guitarist (allowing for an optional two-guitar line-up while also enabling Burchill to play violin). Meanwhile, Kerr had abandoned keyboards to concentrate entirely on vocals. In March 1978, Kerr, Burchill, Donald, Barnwell and McGee were joined by the Barra-born keyboard player Mick MacNeil. The band got a residency at the Mars Bar in Glasgow and played various other venues in Scotland and rapidly established a reputation as an exciting live act (usually performing in full makeup) and gained a management deal with Bruce Findlay, owner of the Bruce's Records chain of record shops. Findlay also owned Zoom Records (a subsidiary of the Arista Records label), and used his position to get Simple Minds signed to Arista. By early 1980, Findlay would have become the band's full-time manager via his Schoolhouse Management company.

The band's line-up did not settle until the end of 1978. Tony Donald quit in April 1978, before the first Simple Minds demo tape was recorded (he later became Burchill's guitar technician). He was replaced by Duncan Barnwell's friend Derek Forbes (formerly the bass player with The Subs). In November 1978, Barnwell was asked to leave. The remaining quintet of Kerr, Burchill, MacNeil, Forbes and McGee—generally considered as the first serious line-up of Simple Minds—began rehearsing the set of Kerr/Burchill-written songs which appear on their début album.

Initial albums: Life in a Day, Real to Real Cacophony and Empires and Dance (1979–1980)

On 27 March 1979 the band made their first television appearance, performing the songs "Chelsea Girl" and "Life in a Day" on BBC's The Old Grey Whistle Test.

The first Simple Minds album, Life in a Day, was produced by John Leckie and released by Zoom Records in April 1979. The album's title track "Life in a Day" was released as Simple Minds' first single and reached No. 62 in the UK Singles Chart, with the album reaching No. 30 in the UK Albums Chart. The next single ("Chelsea Girl") failed to chart. While preparing ideas for the next record, they played a support slot for Magazine, following which they went back to the studio with Leckie to work on new material.

Simple Minds' second release, Real to Real Cacophony was a significant departure from the pop tunes of Life in a Day. The album had a darker and far more experimental atmosphere, announcing some of the new wave experimentation that became the band's trademark sound over the next two albums. Much of the album was written in the studio, although Simple Minds had been playing early versions of several tracks during the recent tour dates.

Innovations which the band displayed on Real to Real Cacophony included minimalist structures based around the rhythm section of Forbes and McGee, plus the occasional use of unconventional time signatures. The band also experimented with elements of dub, and included the wordless and atmospheric "Veldt" in which they attempted to create an impression of an African landscape using electronic buzzes and drones, Burchill's improvised saxophone lines and Kerr's chants and cries. The album also generated the single "Changeling". The band toured in Europe and the UK on their "Real to Real Cacophony Tour" and also made a short visit to New York. Their performance of the songs "Premonition", "Factory" and "Changeling" at Hurrah in October 1979 was filmed for The Old Grey Whistle Test.

Real to Real Cacophony caught the attention of Peter Gabriel who selected Simple Minds as the opening act on several dates of his European tour starting in August 1980.

The next album was Empires and Dance, released in September 1980. Many of the tracks were minimal and featured a significant use of sequencing. McNeil's keyboards and Forbes' bass became the main melodic elements in the band's sound, with Burchill's heavily processed guitar becoming more of a textural element. With this album, Kerr began to experiment with non-narrative lyrics based on observations he had made as the band travelled across Europe on tour. While a modest commercial success, Empires and Dance received enthusiastic response in the British music press and the tour as support act for Peter Gabriel gave the band the opportunity to play at bigger venues.

Move to Virgin and commercial breakthrough: Sons and Fascination/Sister Feelings Call and New Gold Dream (81–82–83–84) (1981–1984)

In 1981, Simple Minds switched record labels from Arista to Virgin. The following year, Arista put out a compilation album, Celebration, featuring tracks from the three previous albums. 

Simple Minds' first release on Virgin was two albums: the Steve Hillage-produced Sons and Fascination and Sister Feelings Call. The latter album was initially included as a bonus disc with the first 10,000 vinyl copies of Sons and Fascination, but it was later re-issued as an album in its own right. (For the CD release, it was paired on a single disc with Sons and Fascinationat first with two tracks deleted, but in full on later issues.) Further increasing the band's visibility, the single "Love Song" became an international hit (reaching the Top 20 in Canada and Australia), and the instrumental "Theme for Great Cities" proved so enduring a composition that it was later re-recorded in 1991 as a B-side to the single "See the Lights".

During this period, the band's visual aesthetic was established, masterminded by Malcolm Garrett's graphic design company Assorted iMaGes. Characterised at first by hard, bold typography and photo-collage, Garrett's designs for the band later incorporated pop-religious iconography in clean, integrated package designs that befitted the band's idealised image as neo-romantic purveyors of European anthemic pop. Drummer Brian McGee left the band at the end of the Sons and Fascination sessions, citing exhaustion at Simple Minds' constant touring schedule, and a desire for more time at home with family. He also cited disappointment that he was not getting enough credit in the band. McGee joined Glasgow band Endgames, and later Propaganda. 

McGee's initial replacement as Simple Minds' drummer was Kenny Hyslop (ex-Skids, Slik, Zones), who joined the band in October 1981 in time to play the first leg of the Sons and Fascination tour. His interest in New York music (including funk, hip-hop and dance) had an immediate effect on the band's musical development. He stayed long enough to drum on the band's next single, the disco-friendly "Promised You a Miracle" (based on a funk riff from one of the cassettes he played on the band's tour bus) which hit the UK Top 20 and the Australian Top 10. Hyslop "didn't fit in" with the band or their management and was replaced for the second leg of the Sons and Fascination tour in early 1982.

Hyslop was replaced by the Kilmarnock-born percussionist Mike Ogletree (the former drummer for Café Jacques). Ogletree joined Simple Minds for rehearsals in a large converted barn in Perthshire, where he wrote and played the drum parts for the songs that were to become New Gold Dream (81–82–83–84). Ogletree also performed with the band on TV and the second leg of the 'Sons and Fascination Tour'.

The band moved to Townhouse Studios for recording sessions with producer Peter Walsh, who introduced them to a London-born drummer called Mel Gaynor, a 22-year-old session musician with plenty of experience from playing with funk-bands such as Beggar and Co and Light of the World. Working closely with Ogletree in order to capture and maintain the beats from the Perthshire sessions, he played drums on the majority of the record (although Ogletree played drums on three tracks and is credited for percussion across the entire album).

New Gold Dream (81–82–83–84) was released in September 1982, combining the results of the Walsh sessions along with "Promised You a Miracle". The album was a commercial breakthrough and generated charting singles including "Glittering Prize" (which reached the UK Top 20 and Australian Top 10). While some tracks ("Promised You a Miracle", "Colours Fly and Catherine Wheel") continued the formula perfected on Sons and Fascination, other tracks ("Someone Somewhere in Summertime", "Glittering Prize") were pure pop. Jazz keyboardist Herbie Hancock performed a synth solo on the track "Hunter and the Hunted".

The band embarked on their extensive "New Gold Tour" in September 1982, which included dates in the UK, Australia, New Zealand and Canada. Mike Ogletree played on the first leg of the tour, but left the band in November 1982 to join Fiction Factory. Mel Gaynor was recruited (as a full member of the band) for the remaining dates. Simple Minds' first non-Scottish member, Gaynor went on to become the band's longest-standing drummer (and member aside from mainstays Burchill and Kerr) despite thrice leaving and returning in the following decades. The band's late 1982 UK dates included a show at City Hall in Newcastle that was recorded by Virgin and later included on the 2003 Seen the Lights dvd. On these dates the band was supported by China Crisis. The second leg of the tour started in March 1983 and included dates in Europe, USA and Canada. In July they performed at festivals such as Roskilde Festival in Denmark and Rock Werchter in Belgium.

Mainstream success: Sparkle in the Rain, Once Upon a Time and Live in the City of Light (1984–1988)

The next record, Sparkle in the Rain, was produced by Steve Lillywhite and released in February 1984. It gave rise to successful singles like "Waterfront" (which hit No. 1 in a few European countries) and "Speed Your Love to Me" and "Up on the Catwalk". Sparkle in the Rain topped the charts in the UK and hit the Top 20 in several other countries (including Canada, where it reached No. 13). In 1984, Jim Kerr married Chrissie Hynde of the Pretenders (who renamed herself Christine Kerr). Simple Minds headlined a North American tour supported by China Crisis during the Canadian leg and supported the Pretenders in the US while Hynde was pregnant with Kerr's daughter. The marriage lasted until 1990.

Despite the band's new-found popularity in the UK, Europe, Canada and Australia, Simple Minds remained essentially unknown in the US. The band's UK releases on Arista were not picked up by Arista USA who had 'right of first refusal' for their releases. The 1985 film The Breakfast Club broke Simple Minds into the US market, when the band achieved their only No. 1 U.S. pop hit in April 1985 with the film's opening track, "Don't You (Forget About Me)". The song was written by Keith Forsey and Steve Schiff; Forsey offered the song to Billy Idol and Bryan Ferry before Simple Minds agreed to record it. The song soon became a chart-topper in many other countries around the world.

At around this point, the camaraderie that had fuelled Simple Minds began to unravel, and over the next ten years the band's line-up underwent frequent changes. Jim Kerr subsequently recalled "We were knackered. We were desensitized. The band started to fracture. We were lads who had grown up together, we were meant to grow together, politically, spiritually and artistically. But we were getting tired with each other. There was an element of the chore creeping in. We were coasting and this whole other thing was a challenge."

The first casualty was bassist Derek Forbes, who was beginning to squabble with Kerr. Forbes began failing to turn up for rehearsals, and was dismissed. Forbes remained in touch with the band (and soon reunited with another former Simple Minds bandmate, drummer Brian McGee, in Propaganda). Forbes was replaced by former Brand X bass player John Giblin (who owned the band's rehearsal space and was a session musician who had worked with Peter Gabriel and Kate Bush). Giblin made his debut with Simple Minds at Live Aid in Philadelphia, where the band performed "Don't You (Forget About Me)", a new track called "Ghost Dancing" and "Promised You a Miracle". Simple Minds were the first band to be approached to play the Philadelphia leg of Live Aid.

During 1985, Simple Minds were in the studio with former Tom Petty/Stevie Nicks producer Jimmy Iovine. In November, Once Upon a Time was released; former Chic singer Robin Clark, who performed call-and-response vocals with Kerr throughout the album (effectively becoming a second lead singer), and was heavily featured in Simple Minds music videos of the time. The record reached No. 1 in the UK and No. 10 in the US, despite the fact that their major-league breakthrough single "Don't You (Forget About Me)" was not included.

Once Upon a Time went on to generate four worldwide hit singles: "Alive and Kicking", "Sanctify Yourself", "Ghost Dancing" and "All the Things She Said", the last of which featured a music video directed by Zbigniew Rybczyński that used techniques developed in music videos for bands such as Pet Shop Boys and Art of Noise. The band also toured, with both Robin Clark and percussionist Sue Hadjopoulos added to the live line-up.

Because of Simple Minds' powerful stage presence and lyrics that trafficked in Christian symbolism, the band was criticised by some in the music press as a lesser version of U2, despite the fact that both bands were now heading in different musical directions. The two groups were well-acquainted with one another, and Bono joined Simple Minds on-stage at the Barrowlands in Glasgow in 1985 for a live version of "New Gold Dream". Bono also appeared on stage at Simple Minds Croke Park concert and sang "Sun City" during the "Love Song" medley. Derek Forbes also appeared on stage at the Croke Park concert and performed on several songs during the encore. To document their worldwide Once Upon a Time Tour, Simple Minds released the double-live set Live in the City of Light in May 1987, which was recorded primarily over two nights in Paris in August 1986.

By 1988, the band had built their own recording premises — the Bonnie Wee Studio — in Scotland. Following the lengthy period of touring to support Once Upon a Time, Simple Minds began new writing sessions. Initially the band began work on an instrumental project called Aurora Borealis (mostly written by Burchill and MacNeil). This project was then supplanted by an increase in the band's political activism, something which they had begun to stress in recent years (by giving all of the income from the "Ghostdancing" single to Amnesty International, and playing cover versions of Little Steven's "(Ain't Gonna Play) Sun City" on tour), inspired by Peter Gabriel with whom they had toured in the early 1980s.

Simple Minds were the first band to sign up for Mandela Day, a concert held at Wembley Stadium, London, as an expression of solidarity with the then-imprisoned Nelson Mandela. Bands involved were asked to produce a song especially for the event – Simple Minds were the only act which produced one. This was "Mandela Day", which the band played live on the day (alongside cover versions of "Sun City" with Little Steven and a cover version of Peter Gabriel's "Biko" on which Gabriel himself took on lead vocals). "Mandela Day" was released on the Ballad of the Streets EP, which reached No. 1 in the UK Singles Chart (the only time the band did so). Another EP track, "Belfast Child", was a rewrite of the Celtic folk song "She Moved Through the Fair" (which had been introduced to Kerr by John Giblin) with new lyrics written about the ongoing war in Northern Ireland). The single was also an expression by Simple Minds of their support for the campaign for the release of Beirut-held hostage Brian Keenan, kidnapped by the Islamic Jihad.

Street Fighting Years, Real Life and hiatus (1989–1993)

The next album Street Fighting Years (produced by Trevor Horn and Stephen Lipson) moved away from the American soul and gospel influences of Once Upon a Time in favour of soundtrack atmospherics and a new incorporation of acoustic and folk music-related ingredients. The lyrics were also more directly political, covering topics including the Poll Tax, the Soweto townships, the Berlin Wall and the stationing of nuclear submarines on the Scottish coast. The band underwent further line-up changes during the recording of Street Fighting Years. Mel Gaynor and John Giblin both contributed to the recording (and, in Giblin's case, to some of the writing) but both had left the band by the time of the album's release, by which time the band was credited as a trio of Kerr, Burchill and MacNeil. In a new development for the band, various bass guitar and drum tracks were performed by high-profile session musicians. Gaynor's departure from the band was brief (he was rehired for the following tour).

Released in 1989, the album rose to No. 1 in the UK charts and received a rare five-star review from Q magazine. It received a less positive review in Rolling Stone which criticised the band for what the reviewer considered to be political vacuity.  "This Is Your Land" was chosen as the lead single for the U.S., and even with guest vocals from Lou Reed, the single failed to make a mark on the pop charts. Reunited with Mel Gaynor, Simple Minds hired Malcolm Foster (ex-Pretenders) as the new bass player and expanded the live band again by recruiting three additional touring members – Level 42 backing singer Annie McCaig, percussionist Andy Duncan and violinist Lisa Germano). Touring began in May 1989, and included the first and only time that the group headlined Wembley Stadium, where they were supported by fellow Scottish bands The Silencers, Texas and Gun. In September, the concert in the Roman amphitheatre Verona Arena in Italy was recorded for the live video Verona, released by Virgin in 1990.

At the end of the Street Fighting Years tour, Simple Minds laid plans to go to Amsterdam to begin recording a new album. Just before the end of the tour, keyboardist Michael MacNeil announced to the band that he would not be joining them as he needed a break. MacNeil played his last concert with Simple Minds in Brisbane a week later. At the time, MacNeil's departure was put down to health concerns, but he had been gradually suffering disillusionment with the band's lifestyle and touring schedule (as well as what Kerr has referred to as "a number of animated quarrels".)

At around the same time, long-term manager Bruce Findlay was dismissed and over the next few years the band gradually altered to the point where it was a shifting set of musicians around the only remaining core members, Kerr and Burchill. In December 2009, Kerr retrospectively defended the changes in an online diary entry, although he said that MacNeil's departure had been a "colossal fracture". He also paid tribute to his former bandmate and said that MacNeil had been irreplaceable. Simple Minds continued to record, hiring keyboard players as and where required. The first of these was session keyboard player Peter-John Vettese who played live with the band at the Nelson Mandela Freedom Concert and on a short German tour. He was subsequently replaced in the live band by Mark Taylor.

In 1991, Simple Minds returned with Real Life. The album's cover showed a trio of Kerr, Burchill and Gaynor and the writing credits for all songs was Kerr/Burchill. The album reached No. 2 in the UK, where it also spawned four Top 40 singles. In the US, "See the Lights" was the band's last Top 40 pop single. The band toured to support the release, playing as a basic five-piece (Kerr, Burchill, Gaynor, Foster and Taylor) and cutting down on the extended arrangements of the last few large tours. Mel Gaynor left the band in 1992 to pursue session work and other projects, and for the next two years Simple Minds were on hiatus, releasing the compilation album Glittering Prize in 1992.

Good News from the Next World and Néapolis (1994–1999)

Simple Minds returned to activity later in 1994. By now the band was officially a duo of Kerr and Burchill (with the latter taking on keyboards in the studio, as well as guitar). Hiring Keith Forsey (the writer of "Don't You (Forget About Me)") as producer, they began to put together an album which returned to the uplifting arena rock feel of their Once Upon a Time days. With Gaynor now out of the picture, the remaining instrumentation was covered by session musicians (although Malcolm Foster was included among the bass players used for recording).

Good News from the Next World was released in 1995. The album reached No. 2 in the UK and produced the Top 10 hit "She's a River" and the Top 20 single "Hypnotised". The band toured to promote Good News from the Next World, with Malcolm Foster and Mark Taylor as touring bass and keyboard players and Mark Schulman (who had played on the album) on drums. This was Foster's last work with the band, and Schulman returned to session work at the end of the tour. After being released from their contract with Virgin Records, Simple Minds made use of the skills of their original rhythm section, Derek Forbes and Brian McGee (returning after respective eleven- and fourteen-year absences). Although McGee was not involved beyond the rehearsal stage, Forbes formally rejoined Simple Minds in July 1996. The band then reunited with Mel Gaynor for a studio session in early 1997. Gaynor was reinstated as a full-time member for the European tour (which once again featured Mark Taylor on keyboards).

After the tour, album recording sessions were interrupted by Kerr and Burchill's decision to play live (without Forbes, Taylor or Gaynor) as part of the Proms tour (a series of orchestral concerts featuring a mixture of light classical and pop music). The duo played versions of "Alive And Kicking", "Belfast Child" and "Don't You (Forget About Me)" backed by a full orchestra and were billed as Simple Minds.

The new album, Néapolis featured Forbes playing bass guitar on all tracks, and Gaynor on one song, "War Babies". Other drum tracks were recorded by session players Michael Niggs and Jim McDermott, with additional percussion programming by Transglobal Underground/Furniture drummer Hamilton Lee. It was the only Simple Minds album released by Chrysalis Records, who refused to release the album in the U.S., citing lack of interest. The music video for "Glitterball", the album's lead single, was the first production of any kind to film at the Guggenheim Museum in Bilbao, Spain. A European tour followed between March and July 1998, undermined by problems with ill-health and contractual fiascos (including a pull-out from the Fleadh Festival to be replaced by British rock band James).

As Simple Minds' main writing team, Kerr and Burchill had continued to demo and originate material by themselves. For the latest sessions they had shared studio space with a band called Sly Silver Sly who featured Jim Kerr's brother Mark (previously the drummer with Gun) and bass guitarist Eddie Duffy, and who were working with American songwriter Kevin Hunter. While in the studio, the two writing and recording projects (including the Hunter co-writes) merged to become the sessions for the next Simple Minds album, Our Secrets Are the Same. Once again, Forbes and Gaynor found themselves out of the band: Mark Kerr became the new drummer and Eddie Duffy joined on bass guitar. The new-look Simple Minds made their début with a short set of greatest hits at the Scotland Rocks For Kosovo festival, with Mark Taylor returning on keyboards. The displaced Forbes and Gaynor, having apparently been told that the band was not appearing at the festival, formed a new band of their own to play the same concert.

Intermittency: Our Secrets Are the Same, Cry, Seen the Lights and Silver Box (1999–2005)

Having delivered Our Secrets Are the Same to Chrysalis, Simple Minds then found themselves caught up in record company politics while Chrysalis, EMI and other companies attempted to merge with each other. Originally due for release in late 1999, the album remained unreleased after the band mired themselves in lawsuits with Chrysalis. In 2000, the situation became even more complicated when Our Secrets Are the Same was leaked on the internet. Discouraged with their label's failure to resolve the problems, and with both momentum and potential album sales lost, the band once again went on hiatus. Eddie Duffy, Mark Taylor and Mark Kerr all moved on to other projects. Jim Kerr moved to Sicily and took up a part-time career as a hotelier, although both he and Burchill continued working together on various business interests and kept the idea of the band alive.

In 2001, Jim Kerr and Charlie Burchill began working with multi-instrumentalist Gordon Goudie (ex-Primevals) on a new Simple Minds album to be called Cry. Mark Kerr also contributed to the project (this time as an acoustic guitarist and Burchill's co-writer on several songs) while Kerr brought in various Italian musicians as collaborators, including Planet Funk and Punk Investigation. In parallel to Cry, Simple Minds also recorded an album of covers called Neon Lights, featuring Simple Minds versions of songs from artists including Patti Smith, Roxy Music and Kraftwerk. Neon Lights was the first to be completed and released (later in 2001). In the video for the Neon Lights single "Dancing Barefoot", the band consisted of Jim Kerr, Charlie Burchill, Gordon Goudie and Mark Kerr. A 2-CD compilation, The Best of Simple Minds, was released soon afterwards.

Cry was released in April 2002. Although the album did not sell in great numbers in the U.S., Simple Minds felt confident enough to mount a North American leg of their Floating World Tour (named after the instrumental track which closes Cry), their first in seven years. With Goudie opting to remain studio bound (and Mark Kerr leaving the band again), Simple Minds once again recruited Mel Gaynor as tour drummer. The live band was completed by the returning Eddie Duffy on bass guitar and by new keyboard player/programmer Andy Gillespie (of SoundControl). 

On 28 October 2003, Capitol released Seen The Lights – A Visual History, the first-ever Simple Minds commercial (double) DVD, featuring over four hours and twenty minutes of archive footage. The first disc includes the majority of the band's promotional videos. The second disc is devoted to Verona, the band's first video which was originally released in VHS format in 1990. It was upmixed to 5.1 surround sound for the DVD, but otherwise remains the same as the original VHS copy. 

On 18 October 2004, Simple Minds released a five-CD compilation entitled Silver Box. This mostly comprised previously-unreleased demos, radio and TV sessions and live recordings from 1979 to 1995, but also included the long-delayed Our Secrets Are the Same. In July 2005, the band embarked on the "Intimate Tour", a series of low-key European and UK gigs at smaller venues which ended in December 2005. Andy Gillespie was unable to appear at all the gigs, and Mark Taylor returned to cover for him on several occasions. From this point onwards, the two alternated as Simple Minds' live keyboard player, depending on Gillespie's schedule with his other projects.

Black & White 050505, brief original band reunion, Graffiti Soul and Kerr's Lostboy project (2005–2010)

 
With the Kerr/Burchill/Duffy/Gaynor lineup, Simple Minds released Black & White 050505 (their fourteenth studio album), on 12 September 2005. The album's first single, "Home", received airplay on alternative rock radio stations in the US. It reached No. 37 in the UK and was not released in North America. The band spent 2006 touring throughout Europe, the Far East, Australia and New Zealand on the Black And White Tour (with Mark Taylor on keyboards). 

2007 marked the band's 30th anniversary and saw the band embarked on a brief tour of Australia and New Zealand as guests of INXS. The band continued to release audio and video download "bundles" through their official website, featuring live music and several short documentary-style videos recorded during their 2006 tour in Edinburgh and Brussels (including the complete show on 16 February 2006 at the Ancienne Belgique, Brussels, Belgium as "Live Bundles" No. 1 to No. 5 and 6 tracks from the show on 28 August 2006 at the "T on the Fringe" music festival, Edinburgh, as "Live Bundles" No. 6 & No. 7).

On 27 June 2008, Simple Minds played the 90th birthday tribute to Nelson Mandela in London's Hyde Park. The band then undertook a short tour of the UK to celebrate their 30th anniversary. During these concerts, the band performed the entire New Gold Dream (81–82–83–84) album and songs from their other albums in a two-part concert performance. Jim Kerr and Charlie Burchill also played a number of concerts with Night of the Proms across Europe in spring, followed by further shows in late 2008. 

In June 2008, Kerr and Burchill briefly reunited with the full original band lineup for the first time in twenty-seven years, when meetings with Derek Forbes, Mick MacNeil and Brian McGee led to a studio rehearsal date. However, the reunion rapidly foundered over disagreements regarding control of the band and equal status for all members.

Reverting to the Kerr/Burchill/Duffy/Gaynor lineup, Simple Minds released a new studio album entitled Graffiti Soul on 25 May 2009. On the November/December "Graffiti Soul UK Tour" they were supported by Orchestral Manoeuvres in the Dark as special guests. A new record label, W14/Universal label, had purchased the Sanctuary label in early 2009. Former Sanctuary Records A&R head John Williams (who had signed the band to Sanctuary) kept his position with the new label, and exercised the option to pick up the remaining Simple Minds albums owed as part of the previous deal.

In May 2009, Graffiti Souls first single, "Rockets", was released as a digital download single only. On 31 May 2009, the album entered the UK Album chart at No. 10, becoming Simple Minds' first album in 14 years to enter the UK Top 10. The album also entered European Top 100 Album chart at No. 9.

Interspersed with Simple Minds activity, Jim Kerr recorded and released his first solo album Lostboy! AKA Jim Kerr on 17 May 2010 under the name "Lostboy! AKA". Explaining the project name and ethos, he commented "I didn't want to start a new band. I like my band ...and I didn't want a point blank Jim Kerr solo album either." A Lostboy! AKA 10-date European tour followed from 18 to 31 May 2010.

Touring the greatest hits with another new line-up (2010–2014)
The band played a mini-concert on 2 October 2010 at the Cash For Kids Ball organised by Radio Clyde at the Hilton in Glasgow, and a full-length concert on 10 December 2010 at the Festhalle in Bern.

In early October 2010, a new line-up of Simple Minds - Burchill, Kerr, Gaynor, Gillespie with new bassist Ged Grimes (ex-Danny Wilson and Deacon Blue) - completed four weeks at the Sphere Recording Studios in London during which four songs were recorded and mixed for a new compilation album to be called Greatest Hits + and for the new Simple Minds studio album. The sessions were produced by Andy Wright and engineered and mixed by Gavin Goldberg. The four songs recorded were an eight-minute-long version of "In Every Heaven" (originally recorded in 1982 during the "New Gold Dream" sessions) and three new compositions: "Stagefright" and "On The Rooftop" both written by Charlie Burchill and Jim Kerr and "Broken Glass Park" originally a Lostboy! AKA song written by Jim Kerr and Owen Parker. From 10 June to 3 July 2011, Simple Minds embarked on the "Greatest Hits Forest Tour", playing a series of seven dates in woodland locations of England, as part of Forestry Commission Live Music.

From 16 June to 28 August 2011, the "Greatest Hits +" tour visited European countries: the UK, Belgium, Germany, France, Italy, Switzerland, Ireland, Gibraltar and Serbia mainly at summer festival venues. Simple Minds played several free concerts (on 4 July 2011 in Potsdam, Germany, on 4 July 2011 in Florence, Italy for the opening of Florence's Hard Rock Cafe, on 18 August in Belgrade, Serbia before 110,000 people and on 27 August in Bad Harzburg, Germany before 25,000 people). To coincide with the 2012 "5X5 Live" European tour, EMI Music released on 20 February 2012 the X5 box set featuring the first five albums over six discs: Life in a Day, Real to Real Cacophony, Empires and Dance, Sons and Fascination/Sister Feelings Call and New Gold Dream (81–82–83–84) (with Sons and Fascination and Sister Feelings Call as separate discs in a gatefold sleeve as well as bonus material on each disc, including B-sides and remixes).

After a gig on 30 March 2012 at the Døgnvill Festival in Tromsø, Norway, the band embarked on 23 June 2012 in Vienna, on a 25-date tour of European summer festivals which ended on 22 September 2012 in Germersheim, Germany. In July they played at the T in the Park festival.

On 21 April Virgin Records released the band's first record ever to be released exclusively for Record Store Day 2012. The 12" single contained two remixes, Theme For Great Cities remixed by Moby on side A and the 2012 remix of I Travel remixed by John Leckie (who produced the original version of the song in 1980) on side B. The 12" was limited to 1,000 copies worldwide, of which 100 copies were sold in Sister Ray Records in London, where Jim Kerr and Charlie Burchill took part in a record-signing session. EMI released on 19 November 2012 a double live album of the tour entitled 5X5 Live.

Simple Minds embarked in late 2012 on an eight-date Australia and New Zealand joint tour with American band Devo and Australian band The Church starting on 29 November 2012 in Melbourne, and ending on 15 December 2012 in Auckland (the only show played in New Zealand). 

On 25 March 2013 a new greatest-hits two- and three-disc collection entitled Celebrate: The Greatest Hits + was released  on Virgin Records, including two new tracks, "Blood Diamonds"  "Broken Glass Park"; the three-disc version also includes "Stagefright", a track which has never been available in CD format before, and unreleased single mixes of "Jeweller to the Stars" and "Space". The North American version of the album contains only one disc. It was followed by a 30-date "Greatest Hits +" UK Tour, which began with a concert in Dublin on 25 March and ended in Ipswich on 4 May 2013.

In October 2013 they toured their "Greatest Hits +" Live Tour in Brazil, United States and Canada, followed by concerts in South Africa, Europe and the UK in November, including four arena shows in Glasgow, Manchester, Birmingham and London, with guests Ultravox at all four concerts.

Big Music and Acoustic (2014–2017)

In November 2014 Simple Minds released their first studio album in five years entitled Big Music, which was followed by a Winter/Spring 2015 UK and European tour (from February to May 2015).

On 22 October 2014, Simple Minds were presented the Q Inspiration to Music award by Manic Street Preachers frontman James Dean Bradfield and saw the first public outing of new member Catherine AD as part of the lineup. On 2 November 2014, Simple Minds introduced Big Music with a special acoustic session for Radio Clyde's The Billy Sloan Collection. Jim Kerr and Charlie Burchill co-hosted the show, choosing some of their favourite records – including Jet Boy by The New York Dolls, The Velvet Underground's Sweet Jane and The Model by Kraftwerk – and playing acoustic versions of songs from Big Music, including "Honest Town" and "Let The Day Begin" and David Bowie cover "The Man Who Sold the World".

In December 2014, Simple Minds recorded an acoustic session at Absolute Radio including live unplugged performances of "Honest Town", "Alive & Kicking", "Let The Day Begin", "Don't You (Forget about Me)" and David Bowie cover "The Man Who Sold the World". The band continued to tour throughout 2015. On 14 November 2015, the band self-released a 29-track double-CD live album entitled Live – Big Music Tour 2015. It was recorded during the 2015 "Big Music" live tour and contained a cross-section of the Simple Minds back catalogue.

On 7 April 2016, Simple Minds performed their first unplugged gig at the Zermatt Unplugged Festival in Zermatt, Switzerland, followed by a second unplugged show in Zürich on 29 October 2016, also at the Zermatt Unplugged Festival. This was the first concert to feature a secondary acoustic live-and-recording line-up of Simple Minds, with Jim Kerr and Sarah Brown on vocals, Burchill on acoustic guitar and accordion, Ged Grimes on bass, Gordy Goudie returning on acoustic guitar and harmonica and new recruit Cherisse Osei on percussion. In May 2016, they were given an Ivor Novello award where Kerr noted that: "we just wanted to be in a great band and take it round the world. We’re very fortunate because we get recognition".

In October 2016, the band embarked on a promotional tour of the acoustic material, including a live concert on 10 November 2016 at the Hackney Empire, London that was broadcast on BBC Radio 2. Simple Minds released Acoustic which was recorded with the new line-up during Summer 2016 and which featured acoustic re-recordings of songs spanning their career. On the lead single, 1982's "Promised You A Miracle", the band were joined by fellow Scot KT Tunstall. The two-disc vinyl version of the album was released on 25 November 2016, including three extra tracks: "Stand By Love", "Speed Your Love To Me" and "Light Travels". In Spring 2017 they embarked on a two-month (47-date) "Acoustic Live '17" UK & European tour.

On 16 November 2016, Simple Minds were given the Forth Best Performance Award at the Radio Forth awards ceremony in Edinburgh.

Walk Between Worlds and line-up changes (2017–2019)

Since September 2014, Simple Minds had been working on new material with the electric Kerr/Burchill/Grimes/Gaynor line-up (minus Andy Gillespie), including the songs "Fireball" and "A Silent Kiss". 

On 15 November 2017, the new album title and track listing leaked on Amazon UK. Entitled Walk Between Worlds, the album features eight tracks while the Deluxe edition includes three bonus tracks (one live and two studio tracks). On 20 November 2017, a 20-second promo video was released on the band's Facebook page, promoting the album. The video featured a snippet of Magic, the lead single, as performed by the six-person Acoustic line-up (now including Catherine AD. Produced by Simple Minds, Wright and Goldberg, Walk Between Worlds was released on 2 February 2018 via BMG and entered at #4 - their highest UK album chart position in over 23 years - and #2 on the Scottish albums charts, the album's highest chart position in all.

In Spring and Summer 2018, the band extensively toured Europe as part of the Walk Between Worlds tour, promoting the new album. Having performed on three tracks on the album, Cherisse Osei now became the band's full-time drummer, replacing Mel Gaynor; Catherine AD also joined the live band on additional guitar, vocals and keyboards. The band notably performed Walk Between Worlds in its entirety during the eight Spring concerts that occurred from 13 February at the Barrowland Ballroom, Glasgow, UK to 22 February 2018 in Berlin, Germany. After a unique show in Mexico City on 20 September 2018, the band extensively toured North America (now minus Catherine AD) from 24 September in Bethlehem, Pennsylvania up to 11 November 2018 in Orlando, Florida as part of the Walk Between Worlds tour.

Live in the City of Angels (2019–2020)

In 2019, Simple Minds released Live in the City of Angels, their new live album capturing the band on their biggest ever (2018) North American tour. Mostly recorded on 24 October 2018 at the Orpheum Theatre, Los Angeles, California (i.e. the City of Angels), the live album was made available on multiple formats. The standard CD and vinyl format feature 25 songs while the Deluxe CD and digital formats feature 40 songs. The album title can be seen as a reference or a nod to their milestone first (1987) live album Live in the City of Light which was (mostly) recorded in Paris, France (i.e. the City of Light). The 40-song collection is spanning, to date, a 40-year career. 

In 2019, Simple Minds also released a new compilation album entitled 40: The Best Of 1979-2019, a comprehensive overview of 40 years of the band's recording career that includes a new track: "For One Night Only", a cover of King Creosote's 2014 song.

Direction of the Heart and touring (2020–present)

The first Europe & UK (Winter–Spring) leg of the "40 Years Of Hits" World Tour 2020 kicked off on 28 February 2020 in Stavanger, Norway but was interrupted with the cancellation of the show due to take place on 11 March 2020 in Herning, Denmark and the cancellation of the rest of the tour due to the coronavirus pandemic. The tour was rescheduled to 2022 with over 80 dates across more than 20 countries in spring/summer 2022.

In October 2020, the band were finishing the recording of a new Simple Minds album in Germany.

On 17 January 2022, Simple Minds released the single "Act of Love" to mark the anniversary of the band's very first performance on 17 January 1978 at Glasgow's Satellite City. "Act of Love" is synonymous with the beginning of the Simple Minds story as it was the first song they played at their first show.

On 14 June 2022, Simple Minds announced the release on 21 October 2022 of their studio album Direction of the Heart via BMG. The very same day, they released the lead single "Vision Thing" for free. Most of the new album's tracks were written, created and demoed in Sicily (where both Jim Kerr and guitarist Charlie Burchill live). Unable to come to the UK because of COVID-19 quarantine rules, Simple Minds recorded the album at Hamburg's Chameleon Studios. On 9 July 2022, Simple Minds released a lyric video for "Vision Thing" on YouTube.

Concert tours

Discography

 Life in a Day (1979)
 Real to Real Cacophony (1979)
 Empires and Dance (1980)
 Sons and Fascination/Sister Feelings Call (1981)
 New Gold Dream (81-82-83-84) (1982)
 Sparkle in the Rain (1984)
 Once Upon a Time (1985)
 Street Fighting Years (1989)
 Real Life (1991)
 Good News from the Next World (1995)
 Néapolis (1998)
 Our Secrets Are the Same (1999/2004)
 Neon Lights (2001) 
 Cry (2002)
 Black & White 050505 (2005)
 Graffiti Soul (2009) 
 Big Music (2014)
 Acoustic (2016)
 Walk Between Worlds (2018)
 Direction of the Heart (2022)

Selected videography
The release dates are the original ones and the formats mentioned are the most recent versions officially available (not necessarily the original release formats).

 1990: Verona 
 1992: Glittering Prize 81/92 
 2003: Seen The Lights – A Visual History 
 2014: Celebrate – Live at the SSE Hydro Glasgow

Awards and nominations

Personnel

Current members
 Jim Kerr – lead vocals 
 Charlie Burchill – electric & acoustic guitar, occasional keyboards 
 Ged Grimes – bass guitar, backing vocals 
 Sarah Brown - backing vocals 
 Gordy Goudie - additional keyboards, guitar, backing vocals 
 Cherisse Osei - drums

Former members
 Brian McGee – drums 
 Tony Donald – bass 
 John Milarky - lead guitar 
 Allan McNeill - rhythm guitar 
 Duncan Barnwell – rhythm guitar 
 Mick MacNeil – composer, keyboards (piano & synthesizers, accordion) 
 Derek Forbes – bass guitar 
 Kenny Hyslop – drums 
 Mike Ogletree – drums 
 Mel Gaynor – drums, percussion, backing vocals 
 John Giblin – bass guitar 
 Eddie Duffy – bass guitar 
 Andy Gillespie – keyboards 
 Catherine AD - keyboards, backing and occasional lead vocals

Live and session musicians
 Paul Wishart – saxophone – Empires and Dance tour 
 Robin Clark – vocals – Once Upon a Time tour 
 Sue Hadjopoulos – percussion – Once Upon a Time tour 
 Lisa Germano – violin – Street Fighting Years tour 
 Annie McCaig – vocals – Street Fighting Years tour 
 Andy Duncan – percussion – Street Fighting Years tour 
 Malcolm Foster – bass guitar 
 Peter-John Vettese – keyboards 
 Mark Taylor  – Keyboards 
 Timothy Scott Bennett – drums 
 Mark Schulman – drums – Good News from the Next World tour 
 Mark Kerr – drums , guitar 
 Berenice Scott – keyboards

Timeline

Notes

References

External links

 Simple Minds official web site

1977 establishments in the United Kingdom
A&M Records artists
Arista Records artists
Articles which contain graphical timelines
British synth-pop new wave groups
Chrysalis Records artists
Eagle Records artists
Musical groups established in 1977
Musical groups from Glasgow
Scottish art rock groups
Scottish new wave musical groups
Scottish post-punk music groups
Sire Records artists
Virgin Records artists
Second British Invasion artists